The 2019–20 Calgary Flames season was the Flames' 40th season in Calgary, and the 48th for the National Hockey League franchise that was established on June 6, 1972. The Flames entered the season as the defending Pacific Division champions.

The season was suspended by the league officials on March 12, 2020, after several other professional and collegiate sports organizations followed suit as a result of the ongoing COVID-19 pandemic. On May 26, the NHL regular season was officially declared over with the remaining games being cancelled. The Flames advanced to the playoffs and defeated the Winnipeg Jets in the qualifying round in four games, but were defeated in the first round by the Dallas Stars in six games.

Standings

Divisional standings

Western Conference

Tiebreaking procedures
 Fewer number of games played (only used during regular season).
 Greater number of regulation wins (denoted by RW).
 Greater number of wins in regulation and overtime (excluding shootout wins; denoted by ROW).
 Greater number of total wins (including shootouts).
 Greater number of points earned in head-to-head play; if teams played an uneven number of head-to-head games, the result of the first game on the home ice of the team with the extra home game is discarded.
 Greater goal differential (difference between goals for and goals against).
 Greater number of goals scored (denoted by GF).

Schedule and results

Preseason
The preseason schedule was published on June 18, 2019.

Regular season
The regular season schedule was published on June 25, 2019.

Playoffs 

The Flames faced Winnipeg Jets in the qualifying round, defeating them in four games.

The Flames faced the Dallas Stars in the first round, but were defeated in six games.

Player statistics

Skaters

Goaltenders

†Denotes player spent time with another team before joining the Flames. Stats reflect time with the Flames only.
‡Denotes player was traded mid-season. Stats reflect time with the Flames only.
Bold/italics denotes franchise record.

References

Further reading
 

Calgary Flames seasons
Calgary Flames
Flames